St. Clair Bayfield (2 August 1875 – 19 May 1967) was an English stage actor, best known as the long-term companion and manager of amateur operatic soprano Florence Foster Jenkins.

Life and career
Bayfield was born John St. Clair Roberts in Cheltenham, England, the son of George Bayfield Roberts, an Oxford-educated country parson, and his wife Ida, the eldest of three illegitimate daughters of Edward Law, 1st Earl of Ellenborough, a prominent politician and Governor-General of India in the years preceding the Indian Mutiny. St. Clair's maternal great-grandfather was Lord Chief Justice of England.  Little is known of Bayfield's early life in England, but as a young man he sailed to New Zealand, where he served as a sailor and soldier: at his 90th birthday party, he sang some of the sea shanties from that period of his life. While there, he tried farming.   

With a fine voice and physical presence, he became involved in amateur theatricals, leading eventually to his joining a professional company touring to Australia. His diary of time spent in Melbourne is included in the "Bayfield Archive" preserved at Lincoln Center, New York. He next acted with a company headed by the impresario William Ben Greet, who abandoned his cast to penury in a remote corner of the United States. That led to the establishment of Actor's Equity, of which Bayfield was a founding member.  His subsequent stage career involved regular appearances on Broadway for several decades, usually in works by British playwrights.  In 1909 he began a vague "common law" relationship with amateur operatic soprano Florence Foster Jenkins, seven years his senior, that lasted the remainder of her life.  The couple lived for many years in an apartment on 37th Street in Manhattan, New York.  Bayfield joined the Ben Greet Players in a revival of Twelfth Night that took the troupe to 56 Pennsylvania towns in 65 days during the summer of 1914. Also in the group was Sydney Greenstreet.

Bayfield lived with Jenkins and managed her career for 36 years.  After Jenkins' death in 1944, he married a piano teacher, Kathleen Weatherley, in 1945.  They lived in Larchmont, New York, where he died in 1967.

Achievements
The Actors' Equity Association bestows the annual St. Clair Bayfield Award upon an actor or actress in a non-featured role in a Shakespearean production.

Theatre credits
Bayfield's credits in Broadway theatre include:

In the media
Bayfield’s relationship with Jenkins was the basis for the biographical drama Florence Foster Jenkins, with Hugh Grant portraying Bayfield and Meryl Streep portraying Jenkins. The film, directed by Stephen Frears, premiered in London on 12 April 2016.

References

External links
 
 St. Clair Bayfield papers, 1898–1986, held by the Billy Rose Theatre Division, New York Public Library for the Performing Arts
 New York Times obituary

1875 births
1967 deaths
People from Cheltenham
British emigrants to the United States
American people of English descent
American male Shakespearean actors
American male stage actors
Male actors from New York City